Habib Khan (born 14 December 1937) is an Indian former cricketer. He played in 40 first-class cricket matches for Hyderabad, Railways and Services between 1956 and 1971.

See also
 List of Hyderabad cricketers

References

External links
 

1937 births
Living people
Indian cricketers
Hyderabad cricketers
Railways cricketers
Services cricketers
Cricketers from Hyderabad, India